Upper Hergest is a hamlet in Herefordshire, England.

References

Hamlets in Herefordshire